Capitaine Marleau is a french television series, created by Elsa Marpeau, that first broadcast on France 3 on 20 December 2014 and since 2021 on France 2.

The series, directed entirely by Josée Dayan, stars Corinne Masiero as the title character, an eccentric captain of the National Gendarmerie, whose mixed personality of dark humour and unconventional approaches often separates her from her colleagues. Three seasons have been broadcast to date, commencing with the first season, which featured Gerard Depardieu, David Suchet, Pierre Arditi, Sandrine Bonnaire, Nicole Garcia and Muriel Robin in principal starring roles alongside Masiero.

A total of 28 episodes have been broadcast to date. Outside of France, the series is broadcast by La Une in Belgium, RTS Deux in Switzerland and Ici TOU.TV in Canada and is available in the United States on the MHz broadcast network and MHz Choice streaming. The series does not currently hold a British broadcaster.

Release
Three DVD box sets have so far been released in France and the United States. The first, released on 22 November 2017, is billed as Season 1 and contains the two-part pilot, plus all four episodes from Season 1 and the first two episodes of Season 2. The US release does not include the two-part pilot.
01) Philippe Muir with Gérard Depardieu (Cyrano De Bergerac) 
02) The House of the Meyer Sisters with Bulle Ogier (The Discreet Charm on the Bourgeoisie}
03) The Mysteries of Faith with Victoria Abril (Tie Me Up, Tie Me Down) 
04) The Hazy Spa with Bruno Todeschini (Nicolas Le Floch) 
05) Optical Illusion with Pierre Arditi (Blood of the Vine) 
06) Night of the Red Moon with Sandrine Bonnaire (La Cérémonie, Monsieur Hire)

The second set, released on 7 November 2018, contains the final episode of Season 1 plus the first five episodes of Season 2.
07) Open Air with Julie Depardieu (Paris je t'aime) 
08) Room with A View with Yolande Moreau (Amelie, Paris je't aime) 
09) Buried Memory with Niels Arestrup (Suite Noir) 
10) Blood and Light with David Suchet (Poirot) 
11) The Young Man and Death with Jean-Hugues Anglade (The Passenger, Braquo) 
12) Double Dealing with Grégoire Leprince-Ringuet (The Black Book)

The third set, released on 27, October, 2020, contains the final two episodes of season 2 and the first four episodes of season 3:
13) The Black Reeds with Nicole Garcia (My American Uncle) 
14) Never to Die Again with Isabelle Adjani (Call My Agent!) 
15) A Voice in the Night with Jeanne Balibar (The Tunnel) 
16) Roller Coaster with Marina Hands (Lady Chatterley) 
17) Lover Gone Bad with Kad Merad (Baron Noir) 
18) Peace and Health with Mélanie Doutey (Post Partum)

Currently, the series has yet to be released on DVD outside of France and the United States.

Transmissions

Episodes

Pilot (2014)

Season 1 (2015—2017)

Season 2 (2017—2018)

Season 3 (2019—2020)

Season 4 (2021)

See also
 List of French television series

References

External links

2010s French drama television series
2015 French television series debuts
French police procedural television series
Television shows set in France
France Télévisions crime television series